Pellowski or Pelowski is a Polish masculine surname, its feminine counterpart is Pellowska or Pelowska. It that may refer to
Anne Pellowski (born 1933), Polish American educator and author
Gene Pelowski (born 1952), American politician
Jannis Pellowski (born 1992), German football goalkeeper
Pascal Pellowski (born 1988), German footballer, brother of Jannis

Polish-language surnames